The following is a list of the 25 cantons of the Val-de-Marne department, in France, following the French canton reorganisation which came into effect in March 2015:

 Alfortville
 Cachan
 Champigny-sur-Marne-1
 Champigny-sur-Marne-2
 Charenton-le-Pont
 Choisy-le-Roi
 Créteil-1
 Créteil-2
 Fontenay-sous-Bois
 L'Haÿ-les-Roses
 Ivry-sur-Seine
 Le Kremlin-Bicêtre
 Maisons-Alfort
 Nogent-sur-Marne
 Orly
 Plateau briard
 Saint-Maur-des-Fossés-1
 Saint-Maur-des-Fossés-2
 Thiais
 Villejuif
 Villeneuve-Saint-Georges
 Villiers-sur-Marne
 Vincennes
 Vitry-sur-Seine-1
 Vitry-sur-Seine-2

References